Brachylia vukutu is a moth in the family Cossidae. It was described by Yakovlev and Lenz in 2013. It is found in Zimbabwe.

References

Natural History Museum Lepidoptera generic names catalog

Cossinae
Moths described in 2013
Moths of Africa